Cyril Stober is a Nigerian journalist and newscaster. He was born in Niger State. He attended Fatima Secondary Secondary now known a Father O'Connell Science College, Minna.

Career
Stober spent over three decades of professional career as a newscaster and journalist. His major role was anchoring the news at 9 pm on NTA network and NTA prime time news. His signature dressing was a native attire, cap and his glasses. In 2015, there was a rumor that he had retired, he surprised viewers as he was seen anchoring the news again. On 21 April 2019, Stober retired from Nigerian Broadcasting Authority. Cyril Stober still anchors regular NTA network programming after his retirement as he is more of a Nigerian icon.

Personal life
Stober was married to Efun Merriman-Johnson, an ex-broadcaster who also worked in the Nigerian Television Authority until their divorce. On 13 January 2019, Stober married Elizabeth Banu in her home town Garkida, Adamawa state, Nigeria. He has three children (two daughters and a son) from his marriage to Efun Merriman-Johnson. His new wife is also a newscaster with the NTA. another broadcaster with Nigeria Television Authority, Abuja.

References 

Living people
People from Niger State
Nigerian television presenters
Year of birth missing (living people)